Ike Thomas is an American former Negro league second baseman who played in the 1930s.

Thomas played for the Indianapolis ABCs in 1932. In 28 recorded games, he posted 27 hits and five RBI in 108 plate appearances.

References

External links
 and Seamheads

Year of birth missing
Place of birth missing
Indianapolis ABCs (1931–1933) players